The 2014 Pac-12 Conference women's basketball tournament was the 2014 edition of the Pac-12 Conference's championship tournament. It was held at the KeyArena in Seattle, Washington from March 6–9, 2014. USC defeated Oregon State 71-62 to win their first Pac-12 Tournament in school history.

Seeds
Teams were seeded by conference record, with ties broken by record between the tied teams followed by record against the regular-season champion, if necessary.

Schedule

Thursday-Sunday, March 6–9, 2014

The top four seeds received a first-round bye.

Bracket

All-Tournament Team
Source:

Most Outstanding Player

See also
2014 Pac-12 Conference men's basketball tournament

References

2013–14 Pac-12 Conference women's basketball season
Pac-12 Conference women's basketball tournament
Basketball competitions in Seattle
Women's sports in Washington (state)
2014 in Seattle
College basketball tournaments in Washington (state)